The Heart of Youth is a lost 1919 American silent comedy film directed by Robert G. Vignola and written by Beulah Marie Dix. The film stars Lila Lee, Tom Forman, Buster Irving, Charles Ogle, Fanny Midgley, Guy Oliver, and Lydia Knott. The film was released on August 24, 1919, by Paramount Pictures.

Plot
As described in a film magazine, Calvin Prendergast (Oliver) and Os Whipple (Ogle), small town neighbors, quarrel over a strip of land on which there is a spring to which both claim ownership. Josephine Darchat (Lee), granddaughter of Calvin, and Russ Prendergast, son of Os, are much attracted to each other although the old men object. Calvin and Os leave town to seek legal advice regarding the spring. During their absence the youngster's romance progresses, rousing the jealousy of a young woman guest of the Prendergasts. She causes a misunderstanding between Jo and Russ by changing a love note of Russ' until it is almost an insult. Calvin and Os arrive back in town, and each man's anger is aroused by reports of activities of the other's family. Calvin decides to take the spring by force and summons a gang of rowdies to his aid. Os likewise calls out a gang. During the skirmish that takes place, one of the Prendergast children fall into the creek. Jo rescues him, and Russ assists Jo from drowning. The discord between the families is smoothed out.

Cast
Lila Lee as Josephine Darchat
Tom Forman as Russ Prendergast
Buster Irving as Jimmy
Charles Stanton Ogle as Os Whipple 
Fanny Midgley as Mitty Whipple
Guy Oliver as Calvin Prendergast
Lydia Knott as Mrs. Prendergast
Fay Lemport as Mildred
Gertrude Short as Cora
Cameron Coffey as Dickey
Vera Sisson as Evie Atherton
Lewis Sargent as Lorenzo
Sylvia Ashton as The Cook
Robert Brower as The Squire
Edward Alexander as Abner

References

External links

1919 films
1910s English-language films
Silent American comedy films
1919 comedy films
Paramount Pictures films
Films directed by Robert G. Vignola
American black-and-white films
Lost American films
American silent feature films
1919 lost films
Lost comedy films
1910s American films